Hasanlu (also Romanized as Ḩasanlū) is a village in Safa Khaneh Rural District, in the Central District of Shahin Dezh County, West Azerbaijan Province, Iran. At the 2006 census, its population was 506, in 98 families.

References 

Populated places in Shahin Dezh County